Jeffery Stanford Agate, OBE (1919 –1977) was the Managing Director of the DuPont factory at Maydown, County Londonderry, Northern Ireland.  He was shot dead by members of the Provisional Irish Republican Army (IRA) outside his home at Talbot Park, Derry as he returned from work on the evening of 2 February 1977.

Early life
Agate was the only son of Carlton and Ethel Agate. He was born in Calcutta, West Bengal, India where his father was employed as an engineer.  He had two older sisters, Theodora and Cynthia.

Educated in England, Agate achieved a BSc in Engineering. In 1957, he joined DuPont as chief engineer at the Maydown plant. He was promoted to plant manager in 1962 and later became Managing Director.

Murder
Agate was a well-liked and respected figure in both DuPont and the Derry community.  Raymond McClean wrote in The Road to Bloody Sunday that "Jeff Agate was an honest and just human being of the highest calibre.  His assassination by the IRA left me in total disbelief and disgust."  Agate's killing prompted an enormous outpouring of public grief that culminated in a mass protest at Guildhall Square in Derry and united people from all communities at a time of heightened sectarian tension.

His widow, Alice Vera Agate (née Dand) returned to her native Newcastle upon Tyne where she lived in relative isolation until her death in 1994. The Agates had no children.

Agate's murder was the first in a series of IRA attacks on businessmen.  The IRA claimed that "Those involved in the management of the economy serve British interests.  They represent and maintain economic interests which make the war necessary."

Eulogy
Jeff Agate's funeral took place on 5 February 1977. The eulogy was given by Brian Faulkner, the Prime Minister of Northern Ireland, as follows:“We are met this morning to honour the memory of one of nature’s gentlemen – true humility, personal charm, absolute integrity – all coupled with great humility.  Those are the qualities for which most of us remember Jeff Agate.  Some of us knew him best in Industry, and whether from his colleagues in the CBI  (Confederation of British Industry), or from Trade Union Leaders in the Irish Congress of Trade Unions, or from his own workforce at Maydown, they gave him a loyalty which few men have the privilege to know and which came to him because all of these people, whether as groups or as individuals, trusted him absolutely.

And he never betrayed that trust.  There was a most moving occasion the day before yesterday when, in pouring rain and a howling gale, virtually the whole workforce at Maydown came out and stood in silence for two minutes.”

Conviction
In 1979, Raymond McCartney was convicted of Agate's murder and sentenced to life imprisonment.  The conviction was overturned in 2007.

References

See also
Chronology of Provisional Irish Republican Army actions (1970–79)
 Murder of Patrick Kelly

1919 births
1977 deaths
1977 murders in the United Kingdom
DuPont people
Officers of the Order of the British Empire
People killed by the Provisional Irish Republican Army
People murdered in Northern Ireland
People from County Londonderry
Terrorism deaths in Northern Ireland
People killed during The Troubles (Northern Ireland)
Deaths by firearm in Northern Ireland
People from Kolkata
1970s murders in Northern Ireland